"Something About You" is a song by English musician, songwriter, producer Elderbrook and English drum and bass band Rudimental. The song was released as a digital download on 9 August 2019 as the third single from Rudimental's debut EP Distinction. The song peaked at number eighty-seven on the UK Singles Chart.

Background
Talking about the collaboration with Rudimental, Elderbrook said, "I've always loved the music and energy that Rudimental put out. This song wouldn't have happened without them and has been amazing collaborating with them!" The band also said, "We have been big fans of Elderbrook's vocals and production over the past few years so it's amazing to finally come together on this track!"

Music video
A music video to accompany the release of "Something About You" was first released onto YouTube on 9 August 2019. The video was directed by Luke Davies.

Track listing

Charts

Certifications

References

2019 singles
2019 songs
Elderbrook songs
Rudimental songs
Song recordings produced by Elderbrook
Song recordings produced by Rudimental
Songs written by Amir Amor
Songs written by Joel Pott
Songs written by Elderbrook
Parlophone singles
Warner Music Group singles
Song recordings produced by Mark Ralph (record producer)